Vladimir Gagloyev (February 1, 1927 in Dodot, Tskhinvali District, South Ossetia – February 12, 1996 in Moscow, Russia) was an Ossetian writer.

1927 births
1996 deaths
Ossetian writers
People from Tskhinval district